Berberis harrisoniana (syn: Mahonia harrisoniana) is a rare species of flowering plant in the barberry family, Berberidaceae. It is known by the common names Kofa barberry, Kofa Mountain barberry, Harrison's barberry, and red barberry.

It native to the southwestern United States, where it occurs in the Sonoran Colorado Desert in far eastern San Bernardino County in southeastern California and in the Sonoran Desert region in southwestern Arizona (Yuma, La Paz, Pima and Maricopa counties).

It occurs in shaded, rocky canyons in the mountains, at an elevation of approximately 800–1000 m.

Description
This plant is a rounded shrub usually growing up to 1.5 meters tall, sometimes reaching 2 meters. The leaves are trifoliate, with three spine-tipped leaflets each a few centimeters long. The inflorescence is a dense cluster of up to 11 flowers. Each bright yellow flower has 9 sepals. The fruit is a juicy blue-black berry about half a centimeter wide.

The compound leaves place this species in the group sometimes segregated as the genus Mahonia.

References

External links
Calflora Database: Berberis harrisoniana (Harrison's barberry)
Jepson eFlora treatment: Berberis harrisoniana

harrisoniana
Flora of the Sonoran Deserts
Flora of the California desert regions
Flora of Arizona
Natural history of the Colorado Desert
Natural history of the Lower Colorado River Valley
Natural history of San Bernardino County, California
Plants described in 1939